RegioJet a.s. (VKM: RJ) is a private Czech provider of passenger rail and bus transport. The company Student Agency, owned by Czech businessman Radim Jančura, is the sole owner. A sister company of the same name, with its registered office in Bratislava, is an operator of passenger rail and bus transport in Slovakia.

The company operates bus routes around the Czech Republic, Slovakia and to another 90 cities throughout Europe, and operates rail routes around the Czech Republic, Slovakia and operate routes to other European cities, such as Vienna.

History
The company began to operate regular bus transport under the brand Student Agency in 2004, having operated international bus transport from 1996.

On 24 February 2006, Student Agency was recognised in the TTG Travel Awards of 2005 as “Best flight (IATA) agency in the Czech Republic” and “Best bus transporter”. In the same year, CEO Radim Jančura expressed his intention to extend Student Agency's bus transport within 3 years and to also become a provider of rail.

The company RegioJet a.s. was incorporated in the Companies Register on 20 March 2009 with the subject of enterprise “production, business and services not stated in attachments 1 to 3 of the Trade Licensing Act” and on 6 October 2009 the subject of activity “operator of railway and railway transport” was registered. A sister company of the same name, RegioJet a.s., with its registered office in Bratislava was established in 2010 and is nowadays an operator of rail and bus transport in Slovakia.

Occasional public rail transport under the brand RegioJet was operated for the first time on 24 April 2010. The operation of the first railway line of regular passenger transport began on 26 September 2011.

In 2016, bus transport, still under the Student Agency brand, was incorporated under the RegioJet brand for the first time. The decision to include bus transport under the marketing brand RegioJet, which was originally used only for rail transport, originated especially because of the company's interest to unify all transport activities under one brand and also because of the lack of understanding especially for foreign clients – the history of Student Agency was not as well known abroad, so the name appeared to be incomprehensible and impractical for a transport company. The Slovak company RegioJet had started to operate bus transport under the brand RegioJet even earlier, since February 2015.

Bus transport 

SInce 1996, Student Agency operated international bus transport – the first line was from Prague to London, and in the following years buses operated to other European countries, including cities in Germany, Switzerland, Benelux, lines connecting the Czech Republic with cities in Sweden, Norway, Italy, Hungary, Austria and the Slovak Republic, and later in France and elsewhere.

Since 2004, the company Student Agency has operated as a transporter on domestic lines in the Czech Republic. Within the Czech Republic, yellow buses started on the route Prague - Brno for the first time in January 2004, and other lines soon followed. The lines of these yellow buses connected Prague and Brno with 36 cities in the Czech Republic.

On 4 April 2016, the rebranding of bus transport was started in the Czech Republic, as the name Student Agency was considered to be incomprehensible outside of the Czech Republic.

Fleet
In the early stages, during the operator's time as Student Agency, bus transport was provided by vehicles of Spanish brand Ayats Atlantis on the MAN chassis. Afterwards, the company started to use Spanish Beulas buses on the Scania and Volvo chassis. In 2006, the company further invested into five Mercedes-Benz Travego buses, particularly for lines heading to Vienna.

In 2012, the fleet owned by the company amounted to approximately 110 buses, out of which 5 were of a white colour, as the company operated them on the routes between Prague – Nuremberg and Prague – Munich on behalf of Deutsche Bahn, with the other vehicles painted in a noticeable yellow colour.

In 2013, the size of the fleet had increased to 152 buses. The most common type was the Spanish Irizar PB on the Scania or Volvo chassis – the company owned 93 of the type, out of which 67 were equipped with Fun & Relax equipment.

In April 2016, 45 super modern Irizar i8 buses of the newest generation arrived as part of the company's fleet. The first of these buses were introduced on the route between Prague – Dresden – Berlin. The number of buses operating under the brand RegioJet grew to reach 210 as a result of the new vehicles.

Rail transport 
In 2006, Student Agency began to consider operating rail transport. The intention was to start with trains on the Prague-Ostrava route which would compete with the EC/IC trains and SC Pendolino from state-owned operator České dráhy. In June 2007, owner Radim Jančura announced that a tender procedure for a producer was underway. The transport was meant to be cheaper and more luxurious than the Pendolino from České dráhy, with a design resembling the ICE 3 trains operating in Germany.

In March 2009, the subsidiary company RegioJet a.s. was incorporated. The first train started on 24 April 2010 within the advertising event Žluté jaro na železnici (“Yellow spring on the railway”). The price of a return ticket between any stations was a symbolic CZK 5. This advertising operation was described by a representative of the company as the following: “We want to show how modern vehicles can contribute to the simplification and improvement of transport service”.

In the following years, the company participated in selection procedures, submitted offers for operating subsidised transport to various regions and the Ministry of Transport and negotiated with these regions.

Routes

Prague – Ostrava – Havířov – Žilina (SK) – Košice (SK) – Humenné (SK) Route
Since 26 September 2011, RegioJet has operated, at its own business risk, regular rail transport without an order from the Ministry of Transport, only receiving compensation for student and senior discounts from public funds. The beginning of the operation was accompanied by great media coverage.

The company started with three pairs of lines between Prague and Havířov, and in December 2011 the trains also began operating in a regular two-hour interval to other stations in the Ostrava Region (Český Těšín, Třinec) and one pair of lines started to make its way to Žilina.

On 29 September 2011, state-owned operator České dráhy reduced some fares within the campaign ČD Promo, especially the full fare on the routes between Prague–Ostrava, Prague–Brno and Prague – Hradec Králové. The new fare price between Prague and Ostrava was similar to the price set by RegioJet. RegioJet declared this step as unfair competition and a misuse of the dominant position of České dráhy on the market.

In December 2012, RegioJet announced a CZK 30 – 50 mil loss for 2012, which was justified according to the "predatory pricing" by České dráhy on the route between Prague-Ostrava. Train occupancy was approximately 80%. RegioJet blamed the pricing policy of České dráhy for its negative business results, and after raising a challenge before the Antitrust Authority, RegioJet decided to challenge České dráhy before the Court for this connection. The losses would be covered from other activities, as the whole Student Agency group showed gains of CZK 110 mil at earnings over CZK 1.6 billion.

In October 2014, the operator introduced services on the Prague-Košice route, and in December 2015 the operation was enlarged with sleeping cars added.

Bratislava (SK) – Dunajská Streda (SK) – Komárno (SK) Route
On 27 December 2010, RegioJet acquired a nine-year contract with the Ministry of Transport of the Slovak Republic to operate subsidised rail transport on the route between Bratislava – Dunajská Streda – Komárno, with service beginning on 4 March 2012. Before commencing transportation on this route, RegioJet reportedly invested approximately €60,000 into the modernisation of waiting shelters and other furniture at stations, as well as adding security cameras. As of 2019, this route has been returned to the national operator, ZSSK, who now uses Class 754s and ÖBB Class 2016s on this route.

Prague – Brno – Bratislava (SK) Route
Since 11 December 2016, the company has launched trains on the Prague – Brno – Bratislava route. At present (since 2 September 2018), RegioJet trains run 4 times a day to Bratislava, and the other two lines on this route ensure transportation with the terminal in Brno.

Prague - Brno – Vienna (AT)
Since December 2017, the transporter has cooperated with Graz-Köflacher Bahn und Busbetrieb GmbH to operates four pairs of trains from Prague through Brno to Vienna. The trains terminate at Wien Hauptbahnhof with an intermediate stop at Wien Simmering.

R8 Line Brno - Přerov - Bohumín
Regiojet also operates domestic long distance (Rychlík) trains between south Moravian city Brno, Moravian-Silesian cities Ostrava and Bohumín. Trains runs every hour in both directions, 17 times a day. Regiojet uses locomotives Siemens Vectron 193 or occasionally Bombardier Traxx 386 with 2x Low cost Bmpz (ex Swiss SBB Bpm), 2x 2 class Bmz + Bistro section (ex DB Bvcmbz249 couchettes) and 1x 1 class Amz (ex Swiss Am). The stops on the route are Brno Královo Pole - Brno hlavní nádraží (Brno main station) - Vyškov na Moravě (- Nezamyslice-only 2 trains -) - Kojetín - Přerov - Hranice na Moravě - Suchdol nad Odrou - Studénka - Ostrava Svinov - Ostrava hlavní nádraží (Ostrava main station) - Bohumín.

Praha - Bratislava - Budapest - Rijeka/Split
In 2021 RegioJet launched a new seasonal line from Prague to Rijeka and Split in Croatia, dividing in Ogulin. The line only operates in the summer. In Croatia the train is pulled by Hžpp/Hž locomotives, usually two Hž 1141 from the border to Rijeka and two Hž 2044 from Ogulin to Split.

Ústí nad Labem services
From December 2019, Regiojet will take over the 10 year tender for services U5, U7 and U13 in the Ústí nad Labem Region.

Fares and service
Initially RegioJet did not differentiate between classes, with seats in all coaches sold as second class. Later, the operator introduced four tariff zones on its commercial lines – the first and second tariff zone in two classes.

 Low cost (no service): second class with a reduced fare (not guaranteed for all lines) - open space coach, no drawers, bottled water is included in the fare price and a daily newspaper is available.
 Standard: second class – 6-person compartment, possibility of having a compartment for children and a quiet zone compartment, possibility of utilising the Astra coach with an entertainment programme in the in-built screens in each seat
 Relax: second class – open space coach, possibility for separate seats, large tables.

In both Standard and Relax classes, passengers receive a daily newspaper and magazines, coffee and bottled water free of charge and at the same time may order other paid-for snack items from an onboard menu.

 Business: first class – compartment for 4 persons, possibility of a quiet zone compartment, free daily newspaper and economic magazines as well as coffee, cookies, high-quality teas, orange juice or Bohemia Sekt (sparkling wine).

An internet connection is available free of charge and the option to book a specific seat is available for all classes.

Rolling stock

Locomotives
In May 2010, the purchase of 9 Škoda Class E630 electric locomotives was announced. They were sold to Ferrovie Nord Milano in the 1990s and had been modified according to the conditions of the Italian market. After the purchase, the locomotives were modified for operation in the Czech Republic; the gear ratio was changed in order to increase the maximum speed of 140 km/h.

The newest additions to the locomotive fleet are fifteen Traxx locomotives, Class 388s, from the Canadian manufacturer Bombardier – they entered service between 2020 and 2021. RegioJet had a public survey as to which colour motif to use on the ends of their new Class 388s - the Red motif was chosen to be the most popular out of a choice of four.

Coaches
All of the transporter's coaches have the corporate yellow outer paint and blue-red logo of the name REGIOJET. In addition, there is signate to denote the class, respective fares and pictograms of the offered services close to the entrance door.

In June 2011, RegioJet purchased 14 used coaches from Austrian operator ÖBB, which had been previously reconstructed to reach speeds of 200 km/h and retrofitted with AC, vacuum toilets and power sockets. They were transported to the Czech Republic in early June 2011 and late July 2011, before entering service in September 2011 having undergone a complete interior adjustment. Another 14 coaches were purchased in July 2011. All coaches (12 ABmz 61 81 30-90 coaches, 8 Ampz 61 81 18-91 coaches, 8 Bmz 61 81 21-90 coaches) were marked as second class by RegioJet, although for ÖBB these coaches and parts of the coaches of class A served as first class. It was reported that in January 2014, RegioJet had purchased another 45 coaches of the same series from ÖBB, with 27 of them first class coaches.

In September 2014 at InnoTrans, the Slovak company Molpir, the supplier of the FUNTORO on-board entertainment system, introduced a high-capacity coach for RegioJet from Romanian manufacturer Astra Vagoane Călători. The coach was designed under cooperation with the interior studio Flagu-Coplass and architect Patrik Kotas. The coaches have seats from German company GRAMMER and feature a TV screen for each seat. Each coach costs approximately €1 mil. 10 coaches were ordered in total, and they should be put into operation in the coming months.

At the end of 2017, the transporter purchased 6 coaches from the bankrupt open-access operator Arenaways – they were manufactured in 2010 and operated for several months in Italy before being purchased by RegioJet. The company ordered another 10 Astra coaches from the Romanian producer.

Diesel multiple units
RegioJet uses 9 3-coach Bombardier Talent DMUs in Slovakia, leased from Alpha Trains.

Regiojet rolling stock

Gallery

References

External links
 
 

Railway companies of the Czech Republic
Railway companies of Slovakia
Articles containing video clips